Eli Valley is an American cartoonist and author. He is best known for his political cartoons, which often feature prominent politicians, businesspeople, and media personalities.

Early life
Valley was born in Rhode Island, and grew up Troy, New York, and New Jersey. His father was a Conservative rabbi, while his mother was secular. Valley has one sister. He attended Jewish day school until 8th grade, and received an undergraduate degree in English from Cornell University. While at Cornell, Valley contributed cartoons to the university's newspaper, the Cornell Daily Sun.

Work
Valley published cartoons in The Forward until they chose to discontinue featuring his work.

Writing in Vulture, Abraham Riesman has referred to Valley's work as "expressionist [and] woodcut-esque."

Valley contributed illustrations to The Chapo Guide to Revolution. Writing in The Pittsburgh Post-Gazette, Will Tomer said the book resembled "an old-school MAD Magazine, thanks in part to the stomach-turning illustrations of Eli Valley."

Valley's "Schlonged!," about Donald Trump's obsession with size, was selected for The Best American Comics 2017.

Discussing Valley's book about European Jewish cities on the news website Jewish Journal, Rabbi John Rosove wrote: "The chronicler of Central European Jewish history, Eli Valley, blames the current Jewish leadership of Prague for its lack of organized, serious and sustained outreach to those of Jewish heritage living in the city, and he despairs of Prague’s Jewish future."

Bibliography

Non-fiction
Great Jewish Cities of Central and Eastern Europe: A Travel Guide & Resource Book to Prague, Warsaw, Crakow & Budapest (1999)

Collections
Diaspora Boy: Comics on Crisis in America and Israel (2017, OR Books)

References

Living people
American cartoonists
People from Rhode Island
American writers
Cornell University alumni
Jewish American writers
Jewish American artists
Alternative cartoonists
1970 births
21st-century American Jews
Critics of Judaism